A20 cells, also called ATCC TIB-208, is a cell line originally derived from B-cell lymphoma in an old BALB/c mouse. AT20 cells are BALB/c lymphoma cells derived from spontaneous reticulum cell neoplasm. ATCC TIB-208 cells originated from B-cell lymphoma in the reticulum cell sarcoma of an elderly BALB/c mouse. A20 cells are used in medical research such as drug screening or vaccine target selection. A20 cells are also highly responsive to immunomodulatory antibodies, and are therefore used frequently in immunotherapy drug studies.

References

External links                                                              
Cellosaurus entry for A20

Rodent cell lines